Rancho Huerta de Cuati was a  Mexican land grant in the San Rafael Hills area of present-day Los Angeles County, California given in 1838 by governor Juan Alvarado to Victoria Reid. The name means "Cuati Garden" in Spanish. The rancho included present-day Alhambra, San Marino, South Pasadena, and Pasadena—and Lake Wilson (now San Marino's Lacy Park).

History
Rancho Huerta de Cuati had been Mission San Gabriel Arcángel lands, before mission secularization in 1834. It was one of the few Mexican grants given to a Native American. With the assistance of the influential Eulalia Pérez de Guillén Mariné, Tongvan Victoria Reid received the rancho for her past service to the mission. Her husband, Hugo Reid was not listed on the title because he was not yet a Mexican citizen. He was naturalized in 1839.

United States
With the cession of California to the United States following the Mexican-American War, the 1848 Treaty of Guadalupe Hidalgo provided that the land grants would be honored.  As required by the Land Act of 1851, a claim for Rancho Huerta de Cuati was filed with the Public Land Commission in 1852, and the grant was patented to Victoria Reid in 1859. 

Hugo Reid died in 1852, and in 1854 Victoria Reid sold Rancho Huerta de Cuati to Benjamin Davis Wilson, who renamed it "Lake Vineyard Ranch".  It consisted of a ranch with a  shallow pond fed by streams of Old Mill El Molino Viejo Canyon and Wilson Canyon (Wilson-Woodbury Creek of Washington Park). 

Later, Wilson deeded the main portion of the rancho to his son-in-law, James de Barth Shorb, who named his Rancho after his grandfather's plantation in Maryland, which in turn had received its name from the Republic of San Marino, in Italy.

References

See also
El Molino Viejo — adjacent grist mill of the mission.
Ranchos of California
List of Ranchos of California
Ranchos of Los Angeles County

 

Huerta de Cuati
Huerta de Cuati
San Gabriel Valley
South Pasadena, California
History of Pasadena, California
San Marino, California
Huerta